Cédric Grand (born 14 January 1976) is a Swiss bobsledder who competed from 1997 to 2010. Competing in four Winter Olympics, he won a bronze medal in the four-man event at Turin in 2006. He was born in Geneva.

Grand also won four medals at the FIBT World Championships with two golds (two-man: 2009, four-man: 2007) and two silvers (two-man: 2001, mixed team: 2009).

Prior to his bobsledding career he competed in track and field. He was the 100 metres bronze medallist at the 1993 European Youth Olympic Days. He is the Switzerland record holder indoor  over 60 metres with 6.60 seconds.

References

External links
 Bobsleigh four-man Olympic medalists for 1924, 1932-56, and since 1964
 Bobsleigh two-man world championship medalists since 1931
 Bobsleigh four-man world championship medalists since 1930
 
 "Cédric Grand retired". International Bobsleigh & Skeleton Federation. (14 October 2010 article accessed 19 October 2010.)

1976 births
Living people
Swiss male bobsledders
Swiss male sprinters
Olympic bobsledders of Switzerland
Olympic medalists in bobsleigh
Olympic bronze medalists for Switzerland
Bobsledders at the 1998 Winter Olympics
Bobsledders at the 2002 Winter Olympics
Bobsledders at the 2006 Winter Olympics
Bobsledders at the 2010 Winter Olympics
Medalists at the 2006 Winter Olympics
Sportspeople from Geneva
21st-century Swiss people